Jan-Kristian Thurner (born 23 February 1998) is an Austrian football player. He plays for DSV Leoben.

Club career
He made his Austrian Football First League debut for Kapfenberger SV on 15 August 2017 in a game against SC Wiener Neustadt.

References

External links
 

1998 births
Living people
Austrian footballers
2. Liga (Austria) players
Kapfenberger SV players
DSV Leoben players
Association football defenders